The Kosovo Davis Cup team represents Kosovo in Davis Cup tennis competition and are governed by the Tennis Federation of Kosovo. 

Kosovo currently compete in the Europe Zone Group IV.

They will take part in the Davis Cup for the first time in 2016, competing in the Europe Zone Group III.

Current team (2022) 

 Jasin Jakupi
 Mal Agushi
 Granit Bajraliu
 Fresk Sylhasi
 Vullnet Tashi

History
On 28 March 2015, Tennis Europe granted membership to the Tennis Federation of Kosovo, which became effective in 2016. In December 2015, the Federation announced that it would compete at the 2016 Davis Cup in the Europe Zone Group III.

Matches 
Full list of Kosovo Davis Cup team matches (since independence):

Note: Kosovo scores first

Statistics
Last updated: Kosovo - Andorra; 25 June 2021

Record
Total: 1–18 (5.3%)

Head-to-head record (2016–)

Record against continents

References

External links
 

Davis Cup teams
Davis Cup
Davis Cup